In mathematics, the Chebyshev rational functions are a sequence of functions which are both rational and orthogonal. They are named after Pafnuty Chebyshev. A rational Chebyshev function of degree  is defined as:

where  is a Chebyshev polynomial of the first kind.

Properties

Many properties can be derived from the properties of the Chebyshev polynomials of the first kind. Other properties are unique to the functions themselves.

Recursion

Differential equations

Orthogonality 

Defining:

The orthogonality of the Chebyshev rational functions may be written:

Expansion of an arbitrary function 
For an arbitrary function  the orthogonality relationship can be used to expand :

where

Particular values

Partial fraction expansion

References 

Rational functions